Newark Renaissance House, Inc. (NRH) is tax-exempt, fully licensed, not-for-profit specialized therapeutic agency funded by the New Jersey Department of Human Services, Division of Addiction Services.  NRH caters to adolescents, pregnant women and families whose lives are affected by substance abuse. NRH was founded in 1975 as a state-approved, privately-funded, residential drug treatment community in Newark, New Jersey. In the years since its founding, NRH has added capacity and services, expanding its facilities and its offerings to include residential substance abuse treatment for adolescent boys, for pregnant women, and for mothers with small children, drug abuse prevention training for at-risk children and teenagers, day treatment for adolescent girls and boys, and outpatient care for individuals and families. Although it remains in the same geographic location as it always has been, NRH has grown over the years from one to three operational buildings.
 
 The primary treatment program at NRH is residential treatment for adolescent boys dealing with alcohol and/or drug abuse and co-occurring mental, emotional, and/or environmental issues, disorders, or conditions.  NRH also specializes in treating addictive behaviors in pregnant women and in women with pre-school-aged children.  The populations it serves are considered by experts to be among the most vulnerable in the community, and among those whose substance abuse activity is growing most rapidly.  NRH emphasizes family treatment within a context of real world community environs. It employs a community therapeutic approach to treating the disease of addiction and other related conduct.
All of NRH’s programs follow intensive schedules made up of individual and group therapy where treatment involves a psychotherapeutic approach and the 12 steps and incorporates help with codependency if necessary.

References

Drug and alcohol rehabilitation centers
Counseling organizations
Addiction organizations in the United States
Mental health organizations in New Jersey